WGBS-LD, virtual channel 7 (VHF digital channel 12), is a low-powered Retro TV-affiliated television station licensed to Carrollton, Virginia, United States and serving the Greater Hampton Roads area. The station is owned by Joan Wright.

Digital television

Digital channels
The station's digital channel is multiplexed:

References

External links

GBS-LD
Retro TV affiliates
Television channels and stations established in 1993
Low-power television stations in the United States
1993 establishments in Virginia
Isle of Wight County, Virginia